Mahisadal Assembly constituency is an assembly constituency in Purba Medinipur district in the Indian state of West Bengal.

Overview
As per orders of the Delimitation Commission, No. 208 Mahisadal Assembly constituency is composed of the following: Mahishadal and Haldia community development blocks.

Mahisadal Assembly constituency is part of No. 30 Tamluk (Lok Sabha constituency).

Election results

2021

2016

  

Dr. Subrata Maiti, contesting as an Independent candidate, was supported by the Left - Congress Alliance.

2011
In the 2011 elections, Dr.Sudarshan Ghosh Dastidar of Trinamool Congress defeated his nearest rival Tamalika Panda Seth of CPI(M).

  

Tamalika Panda Seth, the contesting CPIM candidate From Mahisadal, is wife of the CPI(M) strongman Lakshman Chandra Seth.

.# Swing calculated on Congress+Trinamool Congress vote percentages taken together in 2006.

1977-2006
In the 2006 state assembly elections Tamalika Panda Seth of CPI(M) won the 204 Mahisadal assembly seat defeating her nearest rival Buddhadeb Bhowmick of Trinamool Congress. Contests in most years were multi cornered but only winners and runners are being mentioned. Dipak Kumar Ghosh of Trinamool Congress defeated Dr. Subrata Maiti of CPI(M) in 2001. Sukumar Das of Congress defeated Surya Chakraborty of CPI(M) in 1996 and 1991. Surya Chakraborty of CPI(M) defeated Sukumar Das of Congress in 1987. Dinabandhu Mondal of CPI(M) defeated Ramani Mohan Maity of Congress in 1982. Saswati Bag of Janata Party defeated Dinabandhu Mondal of CPI(M) in 1977.

1951-1972
Ahindra Mishra of Congress won in 1972. Sushil Kumar Dhara  representing Bangla Congress won in 1971, 1969 and 1967, and representing Congress in 1962. In 1957 Mahisadal was a dual seat. It was won by Dr. Prafulla Chandra Ghosh of PSP and Mahtab Chand Das of Congress. In independent India's first election in 1951, the Mahisadal seat was won by the Independent candidate, Kumar Deba Prosad Garga.

References

Assembly constituencies of West Bengal
Politics of Purba Medinipur district